Søren Robert Lund (born 19 June 1962) is a Danish architect with his studio located in Copenhagen, Denmark. Lund studied architecture at the Royal Academy of Fine Arts in Copenhagen from 1982–1989. In 1988, still a student, he won the national competition for the Arken Museum of Modern Art in Ishøj, Denmark. He was awarded the first prize and the commission. On 5 February 1991 he established his own studio, Søren Robert Lund, Architects.

References

External links 
http://www.srlarkitekter.dk
http://www.arken.dk/
http://www.arcspace.com/architects/lund/lund_features.html

Living people
1962 births
Architects from Copenhagen
Recipients of the Eckersberg Medal